The 2014 Brunei Super League is the second season of the Brunei Super League. It is organized by the National Football Association of Brunei Darussalam and sponsored by DST Group.

Teams
 Indera SC
 Jerudong FC
 Kilanas FC
 LLRC FT
 Majra United FC
 MS ABDB
 MS PDB
 Najip FC
 QAF FC
 Wijaya FC

League standings

Results

References

External links
Brunei 2013/14, RSSSF.com
DST Group Brunei Premier League, FIFA.com

Brunei Super League seasons
Brunei
Brunei
1